Pinkerton is the second studio album by American rock band Weezer, released on September 24, 1996, by DGC Records. After abandoning plans for a rock opera entitled Songs from the Black Hole, Weezer recorded the album between the songwriter Rivers Cuomo's terms at Harvard University, where he wrote most of the songs.

To better capture their live sound, Weezer self-produced Pinkerton, creating a darker, more abrasive album than their self-titled 1994 debut. Cuomo's lyrics express loneliness and disillusionment with the rock lifestyle; the album is named after the character BF Pinkerton from Giacomo Puccini's 1904 opera Madama Butterfly, whom Cuomo described as an "asshole American sailor similar to a touring rock star". Like the opera, the album contains references to Japanese culture.

Pinkerton produced the singles "El Scorcho", "The Good Life", and "Pink Triangle", and debuted at number nineteen on the US Billboard 200. It failed to meet sales expectations, and received mixed reviews; Rolling Stone readers voted it the third worst album of 1996. Embarrassed, Cuomo returned to more traditional pop songwriting and less personal lyrics for Weezer's subsequent albums. In the years following its release, Pinkerton was reassessed and achieved acclaim; several publications have named it one of the best albums of all time, and it was certified platinum in 2016. It was the last Weezer album to feature the bassist Matt Sharp.

Background

In 1994, after the multi-platinum success of Weezer's self-titled debut album, Weezer took a break from touring for Christmas. In his home state of Connecticut, songwriter Rivers Cuomo began preparing material for Weezer's next album using an 8-track recorder. His original concept was a science fiction rock opera, Songs from the Black Hole, that expressed his mixed feelings about success. Weezer developed Songs from the Black Hole through intermittent recording sessions throughout 1995.

In April 14, 1995, Cuomo, who was born with one leg shorter than the other, had extensive leg surgery to lengthen his right leg, followed by eight and a half weeks of painful physiotherapy sessions. This affected his songwriting, as he would spend long periods hospitalized, unable to walk without the use of a cane, and under the influence of painkillers. In the same period, Cuomo applied to study classical composition at Harvard University with an application letter describing his disillusionment with the rock lifestyle: "You will meet two hundred people every night, but each conversation will generally last approximately thirty seconds ... Then you will be alone again, in your motel room. Or you will be on your bus, in your little space, trying to kill the nine hours it takes to get to the next city, whichever city it is."

Cuomo felt limited by rock music. Every night, after performing with Weezer, he listened to Giacomo Puccini's 1904 opera Madama Butterfly; the "depth of emotion and sadness and tragedy" inspired him to go further with his music. By May 1996, Cuomo's songwriting had become "darker, more visceral and exposed, less playful", and the Songs from the Black Hole concept was abandoned. Weezer's second album would instead feature songs written while Cuomo was at Harvard, chronicling his loneliness and frustration, or what Cuomo referred to as his "dark side".

Recording
In 1995, a few days before Cuomo left to study at Harvard, Weezer spent two weeks at New York City's Electric Lady Studios, where they had recorded their debut, and tracked the songs "Why Bother?", "Getchoo", "No Other One" and "Tired of Sex". Weezer hoped to explore "deeper, darker, more experimental stuff" and better capture their live sound. They decided against hiring a producer, feeling that "the best way for us to sound like ourselves is to record on our own". To give the album a live, "raw" feel, Cuomo, guitarist Brian Bell and bassist Matt Sharp recorded their vocals in tandem around three microphones rather than overdubbing them separately.

While Cuomo was at Harvard, other Weezer members worked on side projects. Sharp promoted Return of the Rentals, the debut album by his band the Rentals, and Bell and drummer Patrick Wilson worked on material for their bands the Space Twins and the Special Goodness. In January 1996, during Cuomo's winter break, Weezer regrouped for a two-week session at Sound City Studios in Van Nuys, California, to complete the songs they had worked on in August. After recording "El Scorcho" and "Pink Triangle", they separated again while Cuomo returned to Harvard.

During Cuomo's 1996 spring break, Weezer regrouped at Sound City Studios and recorded "The Good Life", "Across the Sea" and "Falling for You" before Cuomo returned to Harvard for his finals. They completed Pinkerton in mid-1996 in Los Angeles. Two additional tracks, "I Swear It's True" and "Getting Up and Leaving", were abandoned prior to mixing.

Music and lyrics
Pinkerton features a darker, more abrasive sound than Weezer's debut. Writing from a more direct and personal perspective, Cuomo wrote of his dysfunctional relationships, sexual frustration, and struggles with identity. The album charts his "cycle between 'lame-o and partier'". At just under thirty-five minutes, Pinkerton is, according to Cuomo, "short by design". Genre-wise, critics have described the album as alternative rock, emo, power pop, pop-punk, and lo-fi.

The first song, "Tired of Sex", written before the release of the Blue Album, has Cuomo describing meaningless sex encounters with groupies, reciting his list of encounters and wondering why true love eludes him. "Across the Sea" was inspired by a letter Cuomo received from a Japanese fan: "When I got the letter, I fell in love with her. It was such a great letter. I was very lonely at the time, but at the same time I was very depressed that I would never meet her."

"The Good Life" chronicles the rebirth of Cuomo after an identity crisis as an Ivy League loner. Cuomo, who felt isolated at Harvard, wrote the song after "becoming frustrated with that hermit's life I was leading, the ascetic life. And I think I was starting to become frustrated with my whole dream about purifying myself and trying to live like a monk or an intellectual and going to school and holding out for this perfect, ideal woman. And so I wrote the song. And I started to turn around and come back the other way."

"El Scorcho" addresses Cuomo's shyness and inability to approach a girl while at Harvard; he explained that the song "is more about me, because at that point I hadn't even talked to the girl, I didn't really know much about her." "Pink Triangle" describes a man who falls in love, but discovers the object of his devotion is a lesbian.

Pinkerton is named after the character BF Pinkerton from Madama Butterfly, who marries and then abandons a Japanese woman named Butterfly. Calling him an "asshole American sailor similar to a touring rock star", Cuomo felt the character was "the perfect symbol for the part of myself that I am trying to come to terms with on this album". Other titles considered included Playboy and Diving into the Wreck (after a poem by Adrienne Rich).

Like Madama Butterfly, Pinkerton views Japanese culture from the perspective of an outsider who considers Japan fragile and sensual; the Japanese allusions are infused with the narrator's romantic disappointments and sexual frustration. Cuomo wrote that Pinkerton "is really the clash of East vs West. My hindu, zen, kyokushin, self-denial, self-abnegation, no-emotion, cool-faced side versus my Italian-American heavy metal side". The songs are mostly sequenced in the order in which he wrote them, and so "the album kind of tells the story of my struggle with my inner Pinkerton".

Artwork

The cover artwork is derived Kambara yoru no yuki ("Night snow at Kambara") from the Japanese ukiyo-e artist Hiroshige's 1830s series 53 Stations of the Tōkaidō. Lyrics from Madama Butterfly are printed on the Pinkerton CD in their original Italian: "Everywhere in the world, the roving Yankee takes his pleasure and his profit, indifferent to all risks. He drops anchor at random..."

Behind the CD tray is a map with the title Isola della farfalla e penisola di cane (Italian for "Island of the Butterfly and Peninsula of Dog"). On the map are a ship named USS Pinkerton and "Mykel and Carli Island", alluding to Weezer's fan club founders, and the names of some of Cuomo's influences, including Howard Stern, Yngwie Malmsteen, Brian Wilson, Lou Barlow, Joe Matt, Camille Paglia and Ace Frehley.

Release and promotion
Geffen A&R rep Todd Sullivan described Pinkerton as a "very brave record", but worried: "What sort of light does this put the band in? It could have been interpreted as them being a disposable pop band." Geffen was pleased with the record and felt that fans would not be disappointed.

Weezer turned down a video treatment for the lead single, "El Scorcho", proposed by Spike Jonze, who had helped raise Weezer's status with his videos for "Undone – The Sweater Song" and "Buddy Holly". Cuomo said: "I really want the songs to come across untainted this time around... I really want to communicate my feelings directly and because I was so careful in writing that way. I'd hate for the video to kinda misrepresent the song, or exaggerate certain aspects." The "El Scorcho" video featured the band playing in an assembly hall in Los Angeles, surrounded by light fixtures flashing in time to the music. The director, Mark Romanek, quit after arguments with Cuomo, leaving Cuomo to edit the video himself. The video debuted on MTV's 120 Minutes and received moderate airplay.

Pinkerton debuted at number 19 on the US Billboard charts, its highest position. It sold 47,000 copies its first week, falling far short of Weezer's previous album sales. As Pinkerton was not meeting sales expectations, Weezer felt pressure to make another music video more to the liking of MTV. The music video for "The Good Life", directed by Jonathan Dayton and Valerie Faris, stars Mary Lynn Rajskub as a pizza delivery girl and uses simultaneous camera angles appearing on screen as a fractured full image. Geffen rush-released the video to try to save the album, but was not successful.

Tour 
In October 1996, Weezer toured the Far East, with concert appearances in Australia, New Zealand and Japan. Afterwards, they flew home to Los Angeles, where Wilson and Sharp made a promotional appearance on the nationally syndicated radio show Modern Rock Live. On November 1, Weezer began a tour of North America at the Ventura Theatre in Ventura, California. On November 6, Weezer performed an acoustic set at Shorecrest High School in Seattle due to a contest won by a student. A few of the performances were released in 1997 on the Good Life EP.

Weezer continued to tour until mid-1997. The tour was postponed when sisters Mykel, Carli and Trysta Allan died in a car accident while driving home from a Weezer show in Denver, Colorado. Mykel and Carli ran Weezer's fan club and helped manage publicity for several other Los Angeles bands, and had inspired the "Sweater Song" B-side "Mykel and Carli". Weezer canceled a show to attend their funeral. In August, Weezer and other bands held a benefit concert for their family in Los Angeles.

Pinkerton's Inc. lawsuit 
A day before Pinkerton was to be released on September 24, 1996, a restraining order was obtained by Californian security firm Pinkerton's Inc. The company sued Weezer and Geffen for alleged federal trademark infringement, claiming they were trying to capitalize on the company's reputation. Under the terms of the restraining order, which had Pinkerton's Inc seeking two million dollars in damages, Weezer would be kept from "selling, distributing, or advertising" an album under the name Pinkerton. Geffen spokesman Dennis Dennehy defended the title, arguing that it was a reference to Madama Butterfly and not aimed at "any sort of corporate entity". Cuomo wrote a six-page paper explaining why he chose the title and why he felt it was essential. The case was thrown out of court after the judge determined that "the hardship of not issuing the Pinkerton disc would be greater for Geffen than any hardship Pinkerton's Inc or its shareholders might incur from consumers who mistakenly presume the company has anything to do with the album".

Critical reception

Initial reviews were mixed. Jeff Gordinier of Entertainment Weekly deemed Pinkerton "a collection of get-down party anthems for agoraphobics" and criticized Weezer's choice to self-produce, which he felt resulted in a "sloppy and raw" aesthetic inferior to the pop sound of their debut. In Rolling Stone, Rob O'Connor called Cuomo's songwriting "juvenile" and singled out "Tired of Sex" as "aimless". However, he praised "Butterfly" as "a real treat, a gentle acoustic number that recalls the vintage, heartbreaking beauty of Big Star ... suggesting that underneath the geeky teenager pose is an artist well on his way to maturity." Rolling Stone readers voted the album the third worst of 1996. Some listeners were perturbed by the sexual nature of the lyrics; Melody Maker praised Pinkertons music, but advised listeners "to ignore the lyrics entirely".

Steve Appleford of the Los Angeles Times wrote that Pinkertons songs often "are sloppy and awkward, but express a seemingly genuine, desperate search for sex and love". Mark Beaumont of NME praised the album, writing that "by the time the affecting acoustic lament 'Butterfly' wafts in like Big Star at a wildlife protection meeting, Pinkerton starts feeling like a truly moving album". Ryan Schreiber of Pitchfork wrote that "Pinkerton might actually be a bit much for fans who were wooed with the clean production and immediately accessible sound of these guys' debut, but if given a chance, it might surprise even some anti-Weezer folk." Guardian critic Kathy Sweeney found Pinkerton "noisier and messier than their last album, and all the better for it". In a positive review, Q wrote: "On every tale of romance, delivered in perfect verse/chorus formula, you can see Jennifer Aniston giving it some attitude in the kitchen."

Legacy

Cuomo was embarrassed by Pinkerton's reception and the personal nature of its songs. In August 1997, he wrote: "This has been a tough year. It's not just that the world has said Pinkerton isn't worth a shit, but that the Blue album wasn't either. It was a fluke. It was the ["Buddy Holly"] video. I'm a shitty songwriter."

After the Pinkerton tour, Sharp left the band and Weezer went on a hiatus. During this time, Pinkerton amassed a cult following through internet word of mouth, and a wave of mainstream emo bands including Jimmy Eat World, Saves the Day, Dashboard Confessional and Motion City Soundtrack were citing it as an influence. Cuomo told Rolling Stone in 2001: "The most painful thing in my life these days is the cult around Pinkerton. It's just a sick album, sick in a diseased sort of way." In the same year, he told Entertainment Weekly:

For Weezer's subsequent albums, Cuomo moved to simpler songwriting with less personal lyrics. Rolling Stone described Weezer's 2001 comeback album, the Green Album, as the "anti-Pinkerton", with album art and "squeaky-clean" production that recalled Weezer's debut.

Pinkertons critical standing continued to rise; it came to be considered among Weezer's best work by fans and critics. In 2002, Rolling Stone readers voted it the 16th greatest album of all time; in 2003, Pitchfork gave Pinkerton a perfect score and named it the 53rd-greatest album of the 1990s; and in 2004, Rolling Stone gave the album a new review, awarding it five out of five and adding it to the "Rolling Stone Hall of Fame". Over the following years, it appeared in best-of lists by publications including Spin and Drowned in Sound. By August 2009, it had sold 852,000 copies in the US and was certified gold. In 2016, almost 20 years after its release, it was certified platinum for sales of over one million copies in the US.

By 2008, Cuomo had reconsidered the album, saying: "Pinkertons great. It's super-deep, brave, and authentic. Listening to it, I can tell that I was really going for it when I wrote and recorded a lot of those songs." In 2010, Bell told The Aquarian Weekly: "Pinkerton has definitely taken on a life of its own and became more successful and more accepted ... As an artist, you just have to do what you believe in at the time, whether it’s accepted or not. You just have to keep going with it."

In 2010, Weezer embarked on the Memories Tour, playing Blue and Pinkerton in their entirety. Cuomo said of the tour: "The last time we played all of those [Pinkerton] songs, they went over like a lead balloon. And I just remember that feeling of just total rejection. And then to see 5,500 people singing along to every last word through every song on the album, even the really difficult ones, was incredibly validating for me."

Accolades
Pinkerton has been named one of the greatest albums by numerous publications.

Reissues and other releases
On November 2, 2010, DGC released a "deluxe" Pinkerton reissue with an additional disc containing live performances, B-sides, and previously unreleased songs. The reissue debuted at number six on the Billboard Catalog Albums chart and achieved a perfect score on the aggregate review website Metacritic.

Cuomo's 2011 compilation album Alone III: The Pinkerton Years comprises demos recorded between 1993 and 1996, when Cuomo was studying at Harvard and writing material for Pinkerton and the abandoned Songs from the Black Hole project. The album was included with a book, The Pinkerton Diaries, which collects Cuomo's writings from the era.

In May 2016, Pinkerton was reissued on vinyl by the record subscription service Vinyl Me, Please. The album is pressed on "dark blue translucent vinyl with black marbling" and is packaged in a custom sleeve with pop-out art, a custom lyric sheet, artwork by Japanese painter Fuco Ueda, and a sake cocktail recipe.

Track listing

Personnel
Adapted from the liner notes.

Weezer
 Rivers Cuomo – guitar, vocals, keyboards,  glockenspiel, clarinet 
 Patrick Wilson – drums
 Brian Bell – guitar, backing vocals
 Matt Sharp – bass, backing vocals

Additional musicians
 Karl Koch – percussion on "Butterfly"

Production

 Joe Barresi – engineer
 Billy Bowers – engineer
 Jim Champagne – engineer
 David Dominguez – engineer
 Greg Fidelman – engineer
 Dave Fridmann – engineer
 Hiroshige – cover art
 Rob Jacobs – engineer
 Spike Jonze – photography
 Adam Kasper – engineer
 Karl Koch – webmaster
 George Marino – mastering
 Dan McLaughlin – engineer
 Shawn Everett – engineer, mixer
 Clif Norrell – engineer
 Jack Joseph Puig – engineer, mixing
 Jim Rondinelli – engineer
 Janet Wolsborn – art assistant

Charts

Weekly charts

Year-end charts

Certifications

References

Works cited

External links

 Pinkerton at YouTube (streamed copy where licensed)
 

1996 albums
Albums recorded at Electric Lady Studios
DGC Records albums
Geffen Records albums
Weezer albums
Emo albums by American artists
Concept albums
Albums recorded at Sound City Studios
Pop punk albums by American artists
Lo-fi music albums